The AIFF Elite Academy is the elite academy of the overall AIFF Academies. Started on 1 February 2013, the Elite Academy was started under a youth development project that was started between the AIFF and FIFA. The Elite Academy is the final frontier for players who train at the AIFF Regional Academies in various parts of India.

History
In September 2011, it was announced that both the All India Football Federation and FIFA would work together to set up various regional academies and one elite academy in India with the goal to develop footballers in the country. The first phase of planning would see regional academies starting in Bangalore, Kolkata, Mumbai, and Delhi. The Sikkim regional academy, if finished before the end of 2011, would also be added to the first phase. The second phase would see Chennai, Chandigarh, and Kerala getting academies by March 2013. Each academy would comprise 30-35 under-14 players who would eventually develop to the under-16 level which is what the Elite Academy would comprise.

Problems with the academies started early with the Bangalore, Kolkata, and Delhi regional academies delayed while the Mumbai Academy was started with future India U23 coach, Arthur Papas, at the helm in Mumbai. The reason given for the delay of the opening of the other regional academies was due to the rampant age-cheating that was going on during trials for the regional academies. Of the 120 players selected after playing in the Subroto Cup and other youth competitions, 84 were found to be over-aged and not even acceptable for the under-16 age category.

Eventually the AIFF Elite Academy was launched in 2013.

2018 squad

References

External links
 Elite Academy page on the AIFF website.

Football academies in India
2013 establishments in Goa
Youth League U18
Buildings and structures in Margao
Football in Goa